Mamiyar is a 1953 Indian Tamil-language film directed by K. Vembu. The film stars R. S. Manohar and S. Varalakshmi.

Cast
List adapted from the database of Film News Anandan and from Thiraikalanjiyam.

Male cast
R. S. Manohar
Relangi
B. R. Panthulu
Ganapathi Bhat

Female cast
S. Varalakshmi
M. S. S. Bhagyam
Suryakantham
Girija
Thilakam

Production
The film was produced under the banner Sri Gajanana Productions and was directed by K. Vembu. Sadasivabrahmam wrote the story while the dialogues were penned by M. S. Subramaniam. B. L. Rai was in charge of cinematography and V. B. Nataraja Mudaliyar handled the editing. Art direction was done by Vali and still photography was by Aboobucker. The film was shot at Revathi studios and processed at Vijaya laboratory.

The film was also made in Telugu with the title Kodarikam.

Soundtrack
Music was composed by C. N. Pandurangan while the lyrics were penned by M. S. Subramaniam, Ambikapathy, Suratha and Udumalai Narayana Kavi. Singer is S. Varalakshmi while the playback singers are A. M. Rajah, Ghantasala, K. Rani, A. P. Komala, P. A. Periyanayaki, M. L. Vasanthakumari, Chandra and Kaviyoor Revamma.

References

Indian drama films
Indian black-and-white films
1950s Tamil-language films
Films scored by C. N. Pandurangan